Sir David Hamilton, FRS, MD (1663 – August 1721) was a Scottish physician to Queen Anne, during which appointment he kept a diary.

Life
Born in Scotland, he entered the University of Leiden as a medical student on 30 October 1683. He graduated MD of the university of Reims in 1686. He was admitted a licentiate of the London College of Physicians in 1688, and fellow in 1703.

Elected a Fellow of the Royal Society in 1708, Hamilton became a leading practitioner in midwifery, and was successively physician to Queen Anne, who knighted him, and to Caroline, Princess of Wales. He is said to have acquired a fortune of £80,000, which he lost in the South Sea Bubble. He died on 28 August 1721.

Works
Hamilton wrote:

 An inaugural Dissertation for M.D. "De Passione Hysterica", Paris, 1686.
 The Private Christian's Witness for Christianity, in opposition to the National and Erroneous Apprehensions of the Arminian, Socinian, and Deist of the Age, London, 1697.
 The Inward Testimony of the Spirit of Christ to his outward Revelation, London, 1701. This and the previous work were anonymously published.
 Tractatus Duplex: prior de Praxeos Regulis, alter de Febre Miliari, London, 1710; Ulm, 1711; English translation, London, 1737.

Notes

Further reading
Philip Roberts (ed.), The Diary of Sir David Hamilton, 1709–1714 (Oxford: Clarendon Press, 1975).

Attribution

1663 births
1721 deaths
17th-century Scottish medical doctors
18th-century Scottish medical doctors
Scottish diarists
Fellows of the Royal Society
Knights Bachelor